Jianglin may refer to:
Wu Jianglin, see List of members of the 11th National People's Congress
Liu Gong, Prince of Jianglin, son of Emperor Ming of Han 
Jianglin (EP), an EP by Top Combine